Mammites is a Late Cretaceous (Cenomanian to Turonian) ammonite genus included in the acanthoceratoidean family, Acanthoceratidae, and the type genus for the subfamily Mammitinae. Mammites was named by Laube and Bruder in 1887.

Species 
Species within the genus Mammites include:
 M. mohavanensis Böse, 1923 - found at Loma el Macho, Coahuila, Mexico
 M. mutabilis Reyment, 1955 - known from Cameroon
 M. nodosoides Schlüter, 1871 - found in North and South America, Africa and Europe 
 M. powelli Kennedy et al., 1987 - found in Texas and Colombia
 M. rancheriae Anderson, 1958 - known from the North American Pacific region

Description 
Shells of Mammites are typically stout, usually with a rectangular or squarish whorl section and flattish to slightly concave venter and can reach a diameter of 15–20 millimeters (0.59–0.79 in). Ornamentation is dominated by strong umbilical tubercles and moderate inner and outer ventrolateral tubercles. Ribs are somewhat prominent in juveniles stages but tend to become inconspicuous in the adult. The suture is ammonitic but rather simple. Some species, those with broad first lateral lobes in the suture, have been reassigned to Morrowites

Mammites and Morrowites are rather similar except that  Mammites as redefined has a narrow first later lobe while that in Morrowites is broad and the early whorls in Morrowites are smooth except for widely spaced ribs and constrictions while those in Mammites have normal ribs and tubercles.

Distribution 
Fossils of species within this genus have been found in the Late Cretaceous formations of Angola, Brazil, Cameroon, Colombia (La Frontera, Boyacá, Cundinamarca and Huila) and San Rafael Formations, Egypt, France, India, Madagascar, Mexico, Nigeria, Peru, Romania, Tunisia, United States and Venezuela.

References

Bibliography 
 
 )

Further reading 

 
 
 

Ammonitida genera
Acanthoceratidae
Cretaceous ammonites
Ammonites of Africa
Ammonites of Asia
Ammonites of Europe
Ammonites of North America
Cretaceous Mexico
Cretaceous United States
Ammonites of South America
Cretaceous Brazil
Cretaceous Colombia
Cretaceous Peru
Cretaceous Venezuela
Cenomanian genus first appearances
Turonian genus extinctions
Fossil taxa described in 1887